is a Japanese actress and former pop singer. She is a former tenth-generation member and sub-leader of the pop group Morning Musume and former model for the Japanese fashion magazine Love Berry.

Biography

Early life
Haruna Īkubo was born on November 7, 1994, in Tokyo, Japan.

2009–2011: Modelling
In 2009, Haruna won a special award at the exclusive auditions for the fashion magazine Love Berry. She first appeared as a model in the June number of the magazine. Since the July issue, Haruna Iikubo adopted the stage name . She "graduated" from Love Berry (left the project) in the February 2011 number.

2009–2018: Debut in Morning Musume
On September 29, 2011, at a concert at Nippon Budokan, which was part of Morning Musume Concert Tour 2011 Aki Ai Believe: Takahashi Ai Sotsugyō Kinen Special, it was announced that Haruna Iikubo passed the auditions alongside three other girls: Ayumi Ishida, Masaki Satō and Haruka Kudō, and would be joining Morning Musume.

On April 18, 2012, it was announced that Morning Musume's Tanaka Reina and the 9th & 10th Generation members would participate in a new stage play titled Stacey's Shoujo Saisatsu Kageki. The musical ran from June 6 to 12. On July 20, it was announced that Iikubo, Yajima Maimi, Tokunaga Chinami, Natsuyaki Miyabi and Nakajima Saki were chosen to form the unit DIY♡.

On May 21, 2013, at Tanaka Reina's graduation concert, Haruna and Fukumura Mizuki were appointed the new sub-leaders of Morning Musume.

On August 17, 2018, Iikubo Haruna announced on her blog that she will graduate from both Morning Musume '18 and Hello! Project at the end of the fall tour Morning Musume '18 Concert Tour Aki ~Get Set, Go!~. She left the group on December 16, 2018.

On December 15, Iikubo announced she would produce and lend her voice to the virtual idol Ni-na under the VR corporation HIKKY.

Discography
For Haruna Īkubo's releases with Morning Musume, see Morning Musume discography.

Bibliography

Photobooks
 (January 28, 2017, Odyssey Books)
Female (May 12, 2018, Odyssey Books)

Filmography

Movies
  (2011)
  (2019)

Television
  (Chubu-Nippon/TBS, 2010)
  (NTV, 2012)
  (2019)
  (2019)

Theater
 (2012)
 (2013)
 (2015)
 (2016)
 (2017)
 (2017)
 (2019)

References 

|-

Japanese female idols
Japanese women pop singers
Japanese female models
21st-century Japanese actresses
Morning Musume members
Living people
1994 births
Singers from Tokyo